Aleksandr Andreyevich Sema (Russian: Александр Андреевич Сема, born 13 April 1952) is a Russian rower who competed for the Soviet Union.

Sema was born in 1952 in Saint Petersburg, Russia. He won a gold medal at the 1975 World Rowing Championships in Nottingham with the men's coxed four. He went to the 1976 Summer Olympics in Montreal and rowed with the coxed four in heat 1 only. He was replaced in that boat by Mikhail Kuznetsov, and the team went on to win gold. As a heat rower, he is thus also considered one of the gold medallists.

His son, Anton Sema, represented Russia at the 1996 Summer Olympics in single sculls.

References

External links 
 

1952 births
Living people
Soviet male rowers
Rowers at the 1976 Summer Olympics
Olympic gold medalists for the Soviet Union
Olympic medalists in rowing
World Rowing Championships medalists for the Soviet Union
Medalists at the 1976 Summer Olympics
Rowers from Saint Petersburg
Olympic rowers of the Soviet Union